Penstemon eatonii is a species of flowering plant in the genus Penstemon, known by the common names Eaton's penstemon and firecracker penstemon. It is native to the Western United States from Southern California to the Rocky Mountains. It grows in many types of desert, woodland, forest, and open plateau habitat.

Description
Penstemon eatonii is a perennial herb producing several sprawling to erect stems reaching one meter in maximum height. The leaves are lance-shaped to oval, untoothed, and up to 9 centimeters in length.

The inflorescence produces showy tubular flowers in shades of brilliant red, sometimes exceeding 3 cm in length. The flower is narrow and cylindrical, not spreading much at the mouth.

References

External links
Jepson Manual Treatment
Photo gallery

eatonii
Flora of the Southwestern United States
Flora of California
Flora of Colorado
Flora of Idaho
Flora of New Mexico
Flora of Wyoming
Flora of the Rocky Mountains
Natural history of the Mojave Desert
Natural history of the Transverse Ranges
Flora without expected TNC conservation status